Roman Jebavý and Andrés Molteni were the defending champions, but chose not to participate together. Jebavý played alongside Matwé Middelkoop but lost in the semifinals to Philipp Oswald and Filip Polášek. Molteni partnered Leonardo Mayer but lost in the first round to Oliver Marach and Jürgen Melzer.

Oswald and Polášek went on to win the title, defeating Sander Gillé and Joran Vliegen in the final, 6–4, 6–4.

Seeds

Draw

Draw

References

External links
 Main Draw

Generali Open Kitzbühel - Doubles
2019 Doubles